Bose has sold various computer speaker products since 1987. Most models consisted of two small satellite speakers, sometimes with a subwoofer. 

Models

MediaMate 

The computer speakers from Bose was the "MediaMate" system, which was released in 1987. The MediaMate included magnetic shielding so that they could be placed near a CRT computer monitor without causing the monitor's image to distort. They had dual inputs and two sources (such as a CD player and a computer game) to be played simultaneously, with a dial to adjust the relative level of the two sources. There is no on/off switch for the MediaMate speakers or any tone controls. Production of MediaMate speakers ended in 2005.

In Japan, the MediaMate was sold as the "MM-1". The MM-1 included an "enhance" function, which basically acted as a tone control.. An "MM-2" system was also sold in Japan, which included a subwoofer.

Wave/PC

Companion 2 
The "Companion 2" was released in 2005 as the replacement for the MediaMate. The Companion 2 speakers had two input ports, however (unlike its MediaMate predecessor) there was no control to adjust the level of each source. Virtual surround sound emulation ("TrueSpace Stereo Everywhere") was included.

The "Companion 2 Series II" were introduced in 2006. The appearance changed from round speaker grilles to rectangular speaker grilles.

Compared with the similarly priced M-Audio Studiophile AV20, the Companion 2 speakers were found to have inferior sound quality but the benefit of being able to play two sources simultaneously.

Companion 3 
The "Companion 3" system was released in 2003 and consisted of two satellite speakers and a subwoofer. Control is via a wired remote. Dual inputs allow two sources to be played simultaneously, however it is not possible to adjust the relative level of each source.

The "Companion 3 Series II" was introduced in 2006. Changes included smaller satellite speakers with similar appearance to the Companion 5 system and the speaker grille on the subwoofer changing from circular to square shaped. Sales of the Companion 3 Series II ceased in 2016.

Companion 5 
The "Companion 5" system was first listed on Amazon in 2004. It was a 2.1 system consisting of two satellite speakers, a subwoofer, a wired control unit and an inbuilt sound card, which connected to the computer via USB. The subwoofer was very similar to that used in the Companion 3 Series II system, however the Companion 5 used larger satellite speakers.

In Europe and Asia-Pacific, a "Companion 50" version of the system was also produced.

Companion 20 
The "Companion 20" system was released in 2011 and consists of two satellite speakers and a wired control unit (called "control pod" by Bose). It remains on the market, as of January 2021.

Computer MusicMonitor 

The "Computer MusicMonitor" system was sold from 2007 and consisted of two satellite speakers and a remote control. The Computer MusicMonitor system was judged to have a convenient small size, but sub-standard audio quality for the price. Sales of the Computer MusicMonitor ended in 2017.

In Japan, a similar model called the "Micro Music Monitor (M3)" was released in 2006. The M3 was able to operate on battery power (unlike the Computer MusicMonitor).

References 

Loudspeakers
Bose Corporation